Ako or AKO may refer to: Candace

Places
Akō, Hyōgo, a city located in Hyōgo Prefecture, Japan
Akō District, Hyōgo, a district located in Hyōgo Prefecture, Japan
Ako, Cameroon, a town in Cameroon
Ako, the Japanese name of Alexandrovsk-Sakhalinsky

People
 Ako, the Livonian chieftain of Salaspils, killed in 1206
 Ako (actress), Japanese actress
 Faith Ako, a singer from Hawaii
 Ako Tribe (Kurdish)

Fictional characters
Ako, fictional character from the Capcom video game, Onimusha 3: Demon Siege
A-ko, the female protagonist in the anime Project A-ko
Ako Izumi, a fictional character from the manga Negima
Ako Shirabe, a protagonist from the anime Suite PreCure
Ako  Hayasaka, a protagonist from the Choujin Sentai Jetman

Other uses
Army Knowledge Online
AKO, the IATA code for Colorado Plains Regional Airport in Akron, Colorado
AKO or Algemene Kiosk Onderneming, a chain of 72 bookstores and newsstands in the Netherlands
Ako Aotearoa, the National Centre for Tertiary Teaching Excellence in New Zealand

See also

 Akko (disambiguation)
 ACCO (disambiguation)
 Aco (disambiguation)
 Ko (disambiguation)
 Acho (surname)
 Ákos (name)
 Akho